Elections to Tynedale District Council were held on 1 May 2003. The whole council was up for election and the Conservative Party took overall control over the council.

Election Result

|}

10 Conservative, 2 Labour and 1 Liberal Democrat councillors were elected unopposed.

Ward results

References

2003 English local elections
2003
21st century in Northumberland